is a railway station operated by the Kominato Railway Company's Kominato Line, located in Ichihara, Chiba Prefecture, Japan. It is 34.9 kilometers from the western terminus of the Kominato Line at Goi Station.

History
It was renamed to its present name in December 1954.

Lines
Kominato Railway Company
Kominato Line

Station layout
Yōrōkeikoku Station has a single island platform and a side platform; however, at present only the side platform is in use, serving bidirectional traffic. The station is one of the few on the Kominato line which is staffed.

Platforms

Adjacent stations

External links
  Kominato Railway Company home page

Railway stations in Japan opened in 1928
Railway stations in Chiba Prefecture